USS Maumee (ID-1339) was a United States Navy collier commissioned in 1918. The ship was built in 1897 by Furness Withy and Company, Ltd. at West Hartlepool, England as the cargo ship Maylands of J. F. Wilson & Company. The ship went through a progression of names and owners, becoming Veerhaven in 1905, and Djursland in 1915. Later in 1915, the ship was renamed Maumee after her purchase by the American Transatlantic Company. After the United States' entry into World War I, Maumee was acquired by the United States Navy on 9 January 1918 and commissioned the same day. Maumee was initially assigned to the Naval Overseas Transportation Service, but reassigned to the Destroyer Force on 18 April 1919.

The details of Maumees decommissioning  and subsequent release from U.S. Navy control are unknown. By 1923, she was operating under the name of Dorte Jensen for H. Jenson. According to ship registries, she was broken up on 22 January 1924 at Genoa.

References

NavSource Online: Section Patrol Craft Photo Archive Maumee (ID 1339)

Merchant ships of the United Kingdom
Ships built on the River Tees
1897 ships
Colliers of the United States Navy
World War I auxiliary ships of the United States